Ophiodiscus is a genus of cnidarians belonging to the family Actinostolidae.

The species of this genus are found in America.

Species:

Ophiodiscus annulatus 
Ophiodiscus sulcatus

References

Actinostolidae
Hexacorallia genera